The 2017 Western Kentucky Hilltoppers football team (WKU) represented Western Kentucky University in the 2017 NCAA Division I FBS football season. The Hilltoppers played their home games at the Houchens Industries–L. T. Smith Stadium in Bowling Green, Kentucky as members of the East Division of Conference USA (C–USA). They were led by first-year head coach Mike Sanford Jr. The Hilltoppers finished the season 6–7, 4–4 in C-USA play to finish in a tie for third place in the East Division. They received an invite to the Cure Bowl where they lost to Georgia State.

Previous season
The Hilltoppers finished the 2016 season 11–3, 7–1 in C-USA play to win a share of the East Division title with Old Dominion. Due to their head-to-head victory over Old Dominion, WKU represented the East Division in the Conference USA Championship Game where they defeated Louisiana Tech to be crowned C-USA champions. They were invited to the Boca Raton Bowl where they defeated Memphis.

On December 5, head coach Jeff Brohm resigned to become the head coach at Purdue. He finished at WKU with a record of 30–10, two bowl wins, and two C-USA titles. Defensive coordinator Nick Holt led WKU in the Boca Raton Bowl. On December 14, the school hired Mike Sanford Jr. as head coach.

Preseason 
In a preseason media vote, the Hilltoppers were picked to win the East Division again, receiving 20 of 28 first place votes.

Schedule and results
Western Kentucky announced its 2017 football schedule on January 26, 2017. The 2017 schedule consists of 6 home and away games in the regular season. The Hilltoppers will host CUSA foes Charlotte, Florida Atlantic, Louisiana Tech, and Middle Tennessee, and will travel to FIU, Marshall, Old Dominion, and UTEP.

The Hilltoppers will host two of the four non-conference opponents, Ball State from the Mid-American Conference and Eastern Kentucky from the Ohio Valley Conference and travel to Illinois of the Big Ten Conference and Vanderbilt from the Southeastern Conference.

Schedule Source:

Game summaries

Eastern Kentucky

at Illinois

Louisiana Tech

Ball State

at UTEP

Charlotte

at Old Dominion

Florida Atlantic

at Vanderbilt

at Marshall

Middle Tennessee

at FIU

vs Georgia State–Cure Bowl

Coaching staff

Source

References

Western Kentucky
Western Kentucky Hilltoppers football seasons
Western Kentucky Hilltoppers football